The Brabantse Pijl (or Flèche Branconne) is a Flanders Classics road bicycle race held annually in Flemish Brabant and in Walloon Brabant, Belgium. Since 2005, the race has been organised as a 1.1 event on the UCI Europe Tour.

Zaventem used to be the city of start; in 2008 however, Leuven became the place of start. Until 2009, the finish was located in Alsemberg and, in 2010, it moved to Overijse. Also in 2010, the fixed date of the Brabantse Pijl shifted from the Sunday before the Tour of Flanders to the Wednesday before the Amstel Gold Race.

In 2011, the race was upgraded to a 1.HC event. Edwig Van Hooydonck holds the record for most wins in the race with four between 1987 and 1995.

Winners

Multiple winners
Active riders are in italics

Wins per country

External links

 
UCI Europe Tour races
Cycle races in Belgium
Recurring sporting events established in 1961
1961 establishments in Belgium
Annual sporting events in Belgium
Overijse
Zaventem
Sport in Leuven
Classic cycle races
Spring (season) events in Belgium